Chandeleur may refer to:

 Chandeleur Islands, off the coast of Louisiana, U.S.
 Candlemas, a Christian observance
 USS Chandeleur (AV-10), U.S. Navy ship of World War II

See also
 Chandelier (disambiguation)